William James Norris (born 12 August 1993) is an English professional footballer who plays as a goalkeeper for EFL League One side Peterborough United on loan from EFL Championship side Burnley.

Club career

Royston Town
Without a club at the start of the 2011–12 season, Norris made an approach to join Hertfordshire side Royston Town who in the previous season had narrowly missed out on promotion after finishing 3rd in the Spartan South Midlands League Premier Division. He played a number of games for the reserve team where his performances caught the attention of then first team manager, Paul Attfield, who pulled him into the first team. On 20 September 2011, he made his debut for Royston in a 4–1 home win against Haringey Borough in the Spartan South Midlands League Premier Division Cup. Norris went on to make 41 appearances in all competitions in 2011–12 helping the club to secure the Spartan South Midlands Premier Division title and a cup double which included the Spartan South Midlands League Premier Division Cup and the South Midlands Floodlit Cup. In the quarter final of the Cambridgeshire Invitation Cup against Cambridge City on 25 January 2012, the game was decided by a penalty shoot-out in which Norris pulled off a number of saves in sudden death before scoring the winning penalty to send Royston into the semi-final.

Cambridge United
On 16 July 2012, Norris signed for Cambridge United on a two-year deal and was loaned back to Royston Town for the duration of the 2012–13 season, helping the club to a 7th-place finish in the Southern Football League Division One Central.

Norris spent the first half of the season 2013–14 with Cambridge as second choice to Chris Maxwell, before re-joining Royston in December 2013 on a short-term loan spell. He was recalled to make his first team debut for Cambridge in a 1–0 away win at Tamworth in the Conference Premier on 21 January 2014. On 30 January 2014, he signed a new contract with the club which extended his previous deal by two and a half years to 2016. He went on to make a total of 15 league appearances helping Cambridge make a return to The Football League, after a nine-year absence, via the Conference play-offs. Norris kept a clean sheet in Cambridge's 4–0 victory over Gosport Borough in the 2013–14 FA Trophy Final.

Norris made his Football League debut for Cambridge in a 2–2 draw at home to Accrington Stanley on 11 April 2015. He went on to make a total of 3 appearances in the league in 2014–15 as Cambridge finished 19th in their first season back in the Football League. At the end of the season his contract was extended to 2018, and was loaned to Braintree Town for the beginning of 2015–16. On 8 August 2015, he made his debut for Braintree in a 1–0 away defeat to Chester City in the National League. After a run of impressive performances, keeping four clean sheets in six games, he was named the National League's Player of the Month for October. At the time of collecting the award Norris had amassed 9 clean sheets in the league; the most of any goalkeeper in the top 5 English divisions. On 9 January 2016, Norris was recalled from his loan with Braintree. He went on to make a total of 21 league appearances for Cambridge, keeping 9 clean sheets, as the club finished 9th in League Two. His contract was extended by a further year, to 2019.

In the 2016–17 season Norris saved a club record of five penalties in one season, including two in second half stoppage time against Accrington Stanley. The gloves he used in the double penalty save against Accrington raised £1,000 at a charity auction, with the proceeds being donated to injured footballers Shaun Whiter and Joey Abbs, who were victims of a hit-and-run incident.

Wolverhampton Wanderers
On 11 July 2017, Norris signed a three-year deal for Wolverhampton Wanderers for an undisclosed fee, a day after the then Championship club had signed a fellow former Cambridge goalkeeper, John Ruddy. He made his debut for the club on 8 August 2017 in a 1–0 win against Yeovil Town in the second round of the EFL Cup. Norris made his league debut for Wolves on 6 May 2018 against Sunderland. Wolves were promoted to the Premier League as Champions at the end of the 2017–18 season. Norris made his Premier League debut for Wolves as a second-half injury time substitute in the 1–0 home win against Fulham on 4 May 2019.

Ipswich Town (loan)
On 30 July 2019, Norris joined Ipswich Town on loan for the 2019–20 season. He made his debut for the club in a 3–1 loss to Luton Town in the EFL Cup, on 13 August 2019. On 9 November, Norris saved a penalty during a 1–1 draw with Lincoln City in an FA Cup first round tie at Portman Road. Norris made a total of 20 appearances for the club during his loan spell prior to the League One season being ended early.

Burnley
On 14 August 2020, Norris signed a three-year deal for Burnley for an undisclosed fee. He made his debut for the club in a 4–3 penalty shootout win against MK Dons in the FA Cup on 9 January 2021, saving two penalties in the shootout. On 19 May 2021, Norris made his league debut for Burnley in a 0–3 home defeat to Liverpool.

Peterborough United (loan)
On 6 January 2023, Norris joined League One club Peterborough United on loan until the end of the 2022–23 season. On 16 January 2023, Norris made his league debut for Peterborough in a 2–0 away win against Port Vale.

Career statistics

Honours
Royston Town
Spartan South Midlands Football League Premier Division: 2011–12
Spartan South Midlands Football League Premier Division Cup: 2011–12
South Midlands Floodlit Cup: 2011–12
Hinchingbrooke Cup: 2012–13

Cambridge United
FA Trophy: 2013–14
Conference Premier play-offs: 2014

Wolverhampton Wanderers
EFL Championship: 2017–18

Individual
National League Player of the Month: October 2015

References

External links

Living people
1993 births
Sportspeople from Watford
English footballers
Association football goalkeepers
Hatfield Town F.C. players
Royston Town F.C. players
Cambridge United F.C. players
Braintree Town F.C. players
Wolverhampton Wanderers F.C. players
Ipswich Town F.C. players
Burnley F.C. players
Peterborough United F.C. players
National League (English football) players
English Football League players
Southern Football League players
Premier League players